The 1962 International Cross Country Championships was held in Sheffield, England, at the Graves Park on 24 March 1962.   A report on the event was given in the Glasgow Herald.

Complete results for men, junior men, medallists, 
 and the results of British athletes were published.

Medallists

Individual Race Results

Men's (7.5 mi / 12.0 km)

Junior Men's (4.7 mi / 7.5 km)

Team Results

Men's

Junior Men's

Participation
An unofficial count yields the participation of 126 athletes from 10 countries.

 (13)
 (13)
 (9)
 (14)
 (14)
 (14)
 (7)
 (14)
 (14)
 (14)

See also
 1962 in athletics (track and field)

References

International Cross Country Championships
International Cross Country Championships
Cross
International Cross Country Championships
Cross country running in the United Kingdom
Sports competitions in Sheffield
International Cross Country Championships, 1962
International Cross Country Championships